Victor Nirennold (born 5 April 1991) is a French professional footballer who  plays for Gloucester City as a center back but is also capable of playing as a right back.

Playing career
Nirennold began his career with Stade Rennais, before moving to the United States. He studied Business at Erskine College, playing football for the college's team, the Erskine Flying Fleet. He transferred to Nova Southeastern University and played for the Nova Southeastern Sharks. He played for FC Miami City in the Premier Development League in the 2015 PDL season.

Nirennold signed a two-year contract with English League One side Fleetwood Town following a successful trial spell in August 2015. He made his debut in the Football League on 5 September, helping the "Cod Army" to secure a 1–1 draw with Rochdale at Highbury Stadium. He scored his first goal for Fleetwood in a 1–1 draw with Northampton Town on 6 August 2016.

On 3 August 2018, Nirennold signed for FK Senica in the Slovak Super Liga.

In February 2019, he moved to SHB Đà Nẵng.

On 25 January 2022, Nirennold signed with Scottish Premiership side Motherwell until the end of the season. On 20 May 2022, Motherwell announced that Nirennold would leave the club upon the expiry of his contract on 31 May 2022.

On 4 February 2023, Nirennold signed for National League North club Gloucester City, the funding for the move being supported by a recent crowdfunding campaign.

Style of play

Personal life
Nirennold is of Martiniquais descent.

Career statistics

Club

References

External links

1991 births
Living people
Footballers from Rennes
French footballers
French people of Martiniquais descent
Association football defenders
Association football midfielders
Stade Rennais F.C. players
Erskine College alumni
Nova Southeastern Sharks men's soccer players
FC Miami City players
Fleetwood Town F.C. players
Guiseley A.F.C. players
FK Senica players
SHB Da Nang FC players
UiTM FC players
Motherwell F.C. players
Gloucester City A.F.C. players
USL League Two players
English Football League players
National League (English football) players
Slovak Super Liga players
V.League 1 players
Malaysia Super League players
Scottish Professional Football League players
French expatriate footballers
French expatriate sportspeople in the United States
French expatriate sportspeople in England
French expatriate sportspeople in Slovakia
French expatriate sportspeople in Vietnam
French expatriate sportspeople in Malaysia
French expatriate sportspeople in Scotland
Expatriate soccer players in the United States
Expatriate footballers in England
Expatriate footballers in Slovakia
Expatriate footballers in Vietnam
Expatriate footballers in Malaysia
Expatriate footballers in Scotland